Bernard Robichaud (born March 2, 1960) is an American-born Canadian actor and writer who portrays Cyrus on Trailer Park Boys.

Filmography

Films

Television

References

External links 

American male film actors
American male television actors
American male voice actors
Canadian male film actors
Canadian male television actors
Canadian male voice actors
Living people
1960 births